This is the list of äkıms of North Kazakhstan Region that have held the position since 1992.

List of Äkıms 

 Vladimir Gartman (11 February 1992 – 19 December 1997)
 Danial Ahmetov (19 December 1997 – 12 October 1999)
 Qajymūrat Nağymanov (13 October 1999 – 17 May 2002)
 Anatoly Smirnov (17 May 2002 – 24 December 2003)
 Taiyr Mansūrov (24 December 2003 – 9 October 2007)
 Serık Bılälov (9 October 2007 – 22 January 2013)
 Samat Eskendırov (22 January 2013 – 27 May 2014)
 Erık Sūltanov (27 May 2014 – 14 March 2017)
 Qūmar Aqsaqalov (14 March 2017 – present)

References 

Äkims of North Kazakhstan Region
Äkims of North Kazakhstan Region